William Francis Moran (born 1958) is a retired four-star officer with over thirty-eight years of service and experience. He began his career as a Naval Aviator and rose rapidly to hold command leadership positions at every level of the Navy.

The front-end of Moran's career was spent in the cockpit on anti-submarine warfare (ASW) patrols above the Atlantic and Mediterranean as well as in numerous instructor pilot assignments. After a tour in personnel management, he operated in the Pacific and Middle East theaters conducting ASW and supporting ground forces during OEF and OIF. As a flag officer he served in a variety of positions including Director of Air Warfare and Chief of Naval Personnel prior to becoming the 39th Vice Chief of Naval Operations (VCNO).

He is known for his extensive experience in developing effective leaders and leading teams operating in dynamic and complex environments. His transformative approach to changing the Navy’s human resource structure and policies as Chief of Naval Personnel paved the way for a larger department of defense effort to modernize its talent management policies. And as VCNO he focused on fleet readiness, modernization, education and building service budgets.

Early life and education
William Francis Moran was born and raised in New York. He graduated from Valley Central High School in 1977, and received a Bachelor of Science degree from the United States Naval Academy in 1981 and a master's degree from the National War College in 2006.

Naval career
A P-3 Orion pilot with operational tours spanning both coasts, Moran commanded Patrol Squadron 46 and Patrol and Reconnaissance Wing 2, and served extensively as an instructor pilot in multiple operational tours and in two tours with Patrol Squadron 30. The additional operational tour included staff members for the commander of Carrier Group 6 aboard .

Ashore, Moran served as assistant Washington placement officer and assistant flag officer detailer in the Bureau of Naval Personnel; executive assistant to Commander, U.S. Pacific Command; deputy director, Navy staff; and executive assistant to the Chief of Naval Operations. As a flag officer, he served as commander, Patrol and Reconnaissance Group and director, Air Warfare (N98) on the staff of the chief of naval operations.

Moran assumed duties as the Navy's 57th Chief of Naval Personnel on August 2, 2013. Serving concurrently as the Deputy Chief of Naval Operations, he was responsible for the planning and programming of all manpower, personnel, training and education resources for the United States Navy. He managed an annual operating budget of $29 billion and led more than 26,000 employees engaged in the recruiting, personnel management, training and development of Navy personnel. His responsibilities included overseeing Navy Recruiting Command, Navy Personnel Command, and Naval Education and Training Command.

Moran was the 39th Vice Chief of Naval Operations from May 31, 2016, to June 10, 2019.

Appointment as Chief of Naval Operations and retirement
On April 11, 2019, Moran was nominated for appointment as Chief of Naval Operations. He was confirmed for the position by the U.S. Senate on May 23, 2019.  He was due to assume the position on August 1, 2019.  However, on July 8, 2019, he announced that he would instead decline the post and retire based on "an open investigation into the nature of some of my personal email correspondence over the past couple of years and for continuing to maintain a professional relationship with a former staff officer, now retired, who had while in uniform had been investigated and held accountable over allegations of inappropriate behavior." The Outgoing Chief of Naval Operations, Admiral John Richardson, praised Moran's 38 years of Navy service, calling him "a close friend and colleague" and "superb Naval Officer and leader."

Awards and decorations

References

1958 births
Living people
United States Naval Academy alumni
Military personnel from New York (state)
United States Naval Aviators
National War College alumni
Recipients of the Legion of Merit
United States Navy admirals
Recipients of the Defense Superior Service Medal
Recipients of the Navy Distinguished Service Medal
Vice Chiefs of Naval Operations